Hatsavan or Hats’avan or Atsavan may refer to:
Hatsavan, Kotayk, Armenia
Hatsavan, Syunik, Armenia